Zrenjanin Airport (Serbian Latin: Aerodrom Zrenjanin, Cyrillic: Аеродром 3peњaнин) , also known as Ečka Airport ( / Aerodrom Ečka),  is an airport in the Zrenjanin Municipality, Serbia, which replaced in 1977 old Zrenjanin Airport built in 1929 in Bagljaš. The airport is registered as a sports and trade airport, and used for pilot training.

Location 
Zrenjanin Airport is situated only 7 kilometres southeast from Zrenjanin, and east of the village Ečka on the Zrenjanin–Belgrade highway. It is 75 metres above sea level and has an area of 300 hectares.

History 
The Germans built the airport with concrete runway (1,800 metres long and 50 metres wide, the longest in the world at that time) in 1942 during the occupation of the Banat region, where Zrenjanin is located.  The airport was used by Luftwaffe to carry military attacks on Serbia during World War II.  After the war, the region and the airport were handed back to the Serbs.  The concrete runway was destroyed by JNA in 1948 at the beginning of the Informbiro crisis and its remains are still visible.

Total airport reconstruction (in progress)

Phase 1 (mostly complete) 
The first phase encompasses the building of the control tower, hangar, terminal, aircraft parking area and other essentials.  The Zrenjanin City Council is currently arranging for the required 650,000 euros that is needed to finance the construction and give the Ečka Airport the International Airport status. The airport will be able to host 20 aircraft at any given time.

On 7 May 2007, Zrenjanin Airport gained the license for passenger and cargo traffic from the Civil Air Traffic Directorate.

Phase 2 
The second phase is a 3 million euros reconstruction of the old German concrete runway parallel to the grass runway. The completion of Phase 2 will enable passenger and cargo aircraft to land and take off.

Agreement with Vizium Air 

In September 2008, Austrian company Vizium Air (the general representative of Diamond Aircraft, the largest sports aircraft producer in Europe) signed an agreement with the City Council of Zrenjanin that includes the construction of facilities for sports aircraft plant (opening of two production facilities), a service centre and a flying school in Zrenjanin with reconstruction of concrete runway, which would employ 400 people.

The Austrian company has announced recently that it intended to buy another 15 hectares of land close to the Ečka airport and would invest 30 million euros in the development of the aircraft industry in Serbia.

However, in early December 2009, Vizium Air announced that the agreement has been mutually cancelled by the company and the town's administration, since it was "designed in such a way that realization would be impossible".

See also 
List of airports in Serbia
Diamond Aircraft Industries

External links 
 Page about Zrenjanin airport at the website of the city of Zrenjanin

Sources 
  „Arheološko” svedočanstvo o zrenjaninskoj avijaciji (Politika, 01.10.2008)
  U rušenju hangara pronađena povelja iz 1929. godine (Radio-televizija Vojvodine, 30.09.2008)
  Zrenjaninci prave male avione za Evropu (Blic, 27.08.2008)
 
 Zrenjanin airport information (PDF)
  Vojvođani dobijaju prvi aerodrom?
  10 maja na aerodromu Ečka kod Zrenjanina održaće se prezentacija Cessna aviona (Cessna 182, Cessna 206, Cessna Caravan) sa početkom u 10:00 časova
 "SkyLark" - Ultra-Light Airplane* (Canadian-Czech "DOVA Aircraft" company presentation at Zrenjanin Airport - May 10, 2007)

Airports in Serbia
Buildings and structures in Vojvodina
Zrenjanin